Ryan Hall may refer to:

People
Ryan Hall (fighter) (born 1985), American submission grappler and practitioner of Brazilian Jiu-Jitsu
Ryan Hall (footballer) (born 1988), English footballer
Ryan Hall (rugby league) (born 1987), English rugby league footballer
Ryan Hall (runner) (born 1982), American long-distance track athlete and roadrunner
Ryan Hall (soccer), American soccer player
Ryan Hall, Y'all (born 1994), American YouTuber and Internet personality

Other
Ryan Hall (University of Notre Dame)

Hall, Ryan